Keenaght may refer to:
 Keenaght (barony), County Londonderry, Northern Ireland
 Keenaght (townland), County Londonderry, Northern Ireland